The 133rd Tank Regiment is an inactive tank regiment of the Italian Army based in Altamura in Apulia. Originally the regiment, like all Italian tank units, was part of the infantry, but on 1 June 1999 it became part of the cavalry. Operationally the regiment was last assigned to the Mechanized Brigade "Pinerolo".

History

World War II 

The formation of the regiment began in July 1941 in Pordenone with its staff drawn from personnel of the 33rd Tank Infantry Regiment of the 133rd Armored Division "Littorio". By early November 1941 the regiment had received the following battalions raised by other regiments:

 133rd Tank Infantry Regiment, in Pordenone
 X Tank Battalion "M14/41" (M14/41 tanks, from the 1st Tank Infantry Regiment)
 XI Tank Battalion "M13/40" (M13/40 tanks, from the 4th Tank Infantry Regiment)
 XII Tank Battalion "M14/41" (M14/41 tanks, from the 31st Tank Infantry Regiment)

On 27 November 1941 the 133rd regiment entered the 133rd Armored Division "Littorio", while the 33rd Tank Infantry Regiment left the division on the same date. In January 1942 the "Littorio" was sent to Libya to bolster Axis forces under pressure from the British Operation Crusader. En route one transport carrying the tanks for one of the companies of the XII battalion was sunk by British warplanes in the Mediterranean. After the 133rd Tank Infantry Regiment had arrived in Libya it had to cede the X battalion to the 132nd Tank Infantry Regiment of the 132nd Armored Division "Ariete" and the XI battalion to the 101st Motorized Division "Trieste" to replace the losses suffered by the two divisions during Operation Crusader.

To bring the 133rd regiment back up to strength 31st Tank Infantry Regiment sent its IV and LI tank battalions to North Africa. At the same time replacements for the lost tanks of the XII battalions were sent to North Africa and so the 133rd Tank Infantry Regiment began its move to the front on 31 May 1942 with the following structure:

 133rd Tank Infantry Regiment
 IV Tank Battalion "M14/41" (M14/41 tanks)
 XII Tank Battalion "M14/41" (M14/41 tanks)
 LI Tank Battalion "M14/41" (M14/41 tanks)

The regiment had its baptism of fire on 20 June 1942 during the Axis capture of Tobruk. From then on the regiment participated in all the battles of the campaign: Battle of Mersa Matruh, First Battle of El Alamein, and Battle of Alam el Halfa. The regiment, like the Littorio division, was destroyed during the Second Battle of El Alamein. Its remnants were grouped with the remnants of the Ariete division in the "Cantaluppi" Group, an ad hoc formation commanded by Colonel Gaetano Cantaluppi, and on 20 November 1942 the regiment was declared lost.

Cold War 
On 10 July 1948 the Italian Army raised the 1st Tankers Regiment, which inherited the flag and traditions of the 1st Tank Infantry Regiment. The regiment fielded the I and II tanks battalions and on 1 April 1949 the regiment was renamed 132nd Tankers Regiment "Ariete". In 1954 the regiment raised the III Tank Battalion, which on 5 January 1959 was renamed X Tank Battalion.

10th Tank Battalion "M.O. Bruno" 
During the 1975 army reform the 132nd Tank Regiment was disbanded and on 1 November 1975 the X Tank Battalion became the 10th Tank Battalion "M.O. Bruno", which received the flag and traditions of the 133rd Tank Infantry Regiment. The battalion's number commemorated the X Tank Battalion "M", which had served with the 132nd Tank Infantry Regiment during the Western Desert Campaign. Tank and armored battalions created during the 1975 army reform were all named for officers, soldiers and partisans, who were posthumously awarded Italy's highest military honor the Gold Medal of Military Valour during World War II. The 10th Tank Battalion's name commemorated X Tank Battalion "M14/41", 132nd Tank Infantry Regiment Second lieutenant Pietro Bruno, who was killed in action on 4 November 1942 during the Second Battle of El Alamein. Based in Aviano and equipped with M60A1 Patton tanks the battalion joined the Armored Brigade "Manin".

The 10th Tank Battalion "M.O. Bruno" was disbanded on 10 January 1991 and the flag of the 133rd Tank Regiment was transferred to the Shrine of the Flags in the Vittoriano in Rome. However the flag left the shrine once more and on 17 October 1992 the 60th Tank Battalion "M.O. Locatelli" of the Mechanized Brigade "Pinerolo" was renamed 133rd Tank Regiment. On 9 October 1995 the 31st Tank Regiment of the Armored Brigade "Centauro" was renamed 4th Tank Regiment and the flag and name of the 31st were transferred to the 133rd Tank Regiment in Altamura, while on the same day the flag of the 133rd Tank Regiment was transferred to the army's Tank School in Lecce, where it was stored in the commander's office, until, in case of war, the personnel of the Tank School would have formed the 133rd Tank Regiment.

In fall 2001 the 133rd Tank Regiment was disbanded and its flag transferred to the Shrine of the Flags in the Vittoriano in Rome.

See also 
 Mechanized Brigade "Pinerolo"

References

Tank Regiments of Italy